Ed Reid, (c1915 - 1977) was an author and investigative journalist who exposed organized crime in New York City and Las Vegas.

Early life 
He was born in Manhattan and grew up in Brooklyn. Reid started as a reporter in 1935 and used his writing to fight corruption.

Career 
An eight-part series starting in 1949 exposed the activities of bookmaker Harry Gross and corrupt members of the New York City Police Department.  This exposé led to an investigation by Brooklyn District Attorney Miles McDonald, and resulted in the eventual resignation of Mayor of New York City William O'Dwyer.  His article in True Magazine I Broke the Brooklyn Graft Scandal was the basis for the 1958 movie The Case Against Brooklyn.

In the 1950s and early 1960s, Reid worked at the Las Vegas Sun.  His investigative reporting exposed the hidden ownership interest of mobsters Jake and Meyer Lansky in the Thunderbird Hotel.  Reid, with Ovid Demaris, co-authored The Green Felt Jungle, a New York Times Best Seller for 23 weeks in 1964, that exposed greed and depravity in Las Vegas. The book connected then Senator Barry Goldwater to labor racketeer Willy Bioff. Goldwater threatened a libel suit against the publisher. Reid and Demaris were invited to join a panel on David Susskind's show "Open End" for a discussion of organized crime.  Reid was dismissed from the Las Vegas Sun by publisher Hank Greenspun after he wrote The Green Felt Jungle.

Recognition 
His reporting for the Brooklyn Eagle earned the public service 1951 Pulitzer Prize and numerous other awards.

Family 
He was married to Natalie (Borokhovich) Reid and had two children.

Works
Reid, Ed. Mafia. New York: Random House, 1952.
Reid, Edward. The Shame of New York. [an Account of Crime and Corruption in the City of New York.]. Victor Gollancz: London, 1954.
Reid, Ed. Las Vegas: City Without Clocks. Englewood Cliffs, N.J: Prentice-Hall, 1961.
Reid, Ed, and Ovid Demaris. The Green Felt Jungle. New York: Trident Press, 1963. 
Reid, Ed. The Grim Reapers: The Anatomy of Organized Crime in America. New York: Bantam, 1970. 
Reid, Ed. The Mistress and the Mafia (The Virginia Hill Story). Bantam, 1972.
Reid, Ed. Mickey Cohen: Mobster. Pinnacle Books, 1973.

References

External links

Year of birth missing
American investigative journalists
American male journalists
Non-fiction writers about organized crime in the United States
1977 deaths